Vardaman is a town in Calhoun County, Mississippi. The town's population was 1,316 at the time of the 2010 United States Census.

History
The town is named after James Kimble Vardaman, Mississippi governor from 1904 to 1908. Vardaman was a Democrat who later became a member of the United States Senate.

In the early days of the town, its post office was named "Timberville" while the town was still known as "Vardaman," leading to confusion in various letterheads. Postmaster Henry Clay Payne refused to name a post office after James K. Vardaman who had been accused of attacking Theodore Roosevelt in newspaper editorials published in the Greenwood Commonwealth.

The town's post office was officially named "Vardaman" in 1912.  Vardaman ms was made in 1909.

Geography
Vardaman is located in eastern Calhoun County.  Mississippi Highway 8 passes through the town, leading west  to Calhoun City and east  to Houston, as well as Mississippi Highway 341, leading north  to Pontotoc and south  to Atlanta and Woodland.

The Yalobusha River, a tributary of the Yazoo River, flows past the town less than one mile to the south.

Vardaman is located in one of Mississippi's top five sweet potato-producing counties. The Vardaman Sweet Potato Festival, also known as the National Sweet Potato Festival, is held there annually the entire first week in November. Vardaman has been proclaimed as the "Sweet Potato Capital of the World".

Demographics

2020 census

As of the 2020 United States Census, there were 1,110 people, 440 households, and 318 families residing in the town.

2000 census
, there were 1,065 people, 426 households, and 276 families residing in the town. The population density was 785.3 people per square mile (302.4/km). There were 471 housing units at an average density of 347.3 per square mile (133.7/km). The racial makeup of the town was 58.69% White, 33.90% African American, 0.19% Native American, 0.09% Pacific Islander, 6.38% from other races, and 0.75% from two or more races. Hispanic or Latino of any race were 9.77% of the population.

There were 426 households, out of which 31.2% had children under the age of 18 living with them, 42.3% were married couples living together, 18.3% had a female householder with no husband present, and 35.0% were non-families. 31.0% of all households were made up of individuals, and 15.5% had someone living alone who was 65 years of age or older. The average household size was 2.50 and the average family size was 3.16.

In the town, the population was spread out, with 26.2% under the age of 18, 10.3% from 18 to 24, 27.0% from 25 to 44, 22.1% from 45 to 64, and 14.4% who were 65 years of age or older. The median age was 34 years. For every 100 females, there were 86.8 males. For every 100 females age 18 and over, there were 84.1 males.

The median income for a household in the town was $21,518, and the median income for a family was $29,205. Males had a median income of $25,000 versus $17,750 for females. The per capita income for the town was $13,530. About 22.0% of families and 24.1% of the population were below the poverty line, including 25.8% of those under age 18 and 27.3% of those age 65 or over.

Education
Vardaman is served by the Calhoun County School District. Children in the Vardaman area attend either Vardaman Elementary School (Grades K-6) or Vardaman High School (Grades 7-12). Vardaman High School's sports teams are known as the Rams.

The Vardaman Rams football program has won 14 division titles in school history and has advanced to the North Half State Finals six times. The Rams also have appeared in the playoffs 29 times, which is tied for the 5th most all-time in the state and 2nd most in the 1A classification.

Odie Armstrong, a running back that broke numerous records in the arena football league, played football at Vardaman. In his high school career, Armstrong rushed for 5,838 yards and 104 touchdowns, including 39 scores in a record-breaking senior season.

The Vardaman Lady Rams basketball team has won two state championships, one in 1959 and another in 1969. The Lady Rams also appeared in the state championship tournament in 2016.  The Rams are now coached by Connor Hudspeth or Tupelo, MS.

Notable people 
Odie Armstrong, player in the Arena Football League
Mary Wilma Hodge, physicist
Barbara Yancy, politician

References

External links
Vardaman Sweet Potato Festival

Towns in Calhoun County, Mississippi
Towns in Mississippi